Oscar Amaro de Silva (17 March 1945 – 30 August 2019) was a Brazilian football player and manager.

Playing career
Born in Jaguarão, Amaro began playing football with Grêmio Foot-Ball Porto Alegrense where he would win the Campeonato Gaúcho. After playing for other clubs in the Rio Grande do Sul State championship, he joined Clube Atlético Juventus in 1969. After 1974, Amaro played for other clubs in São Paulo State before finishing his playing career with Esporte Clube Taubaté in 1979, but not before winning the Campeonato Paulista Série A2.

Coaching career 
Amaro was appointed Brunei national team coach in January 1985 on a two-year contract, Amaro was to be given a yearly salary equal to $77400, with the Brunei government covering it. Postponing his arrival in Brunei to celebrate Christmas and New Year with his family, the Brazilian trainer was the third foreigner to ever coach the country's national selection, enduing the nation's Football Association with a sense of optimism.

He led the Wasps in their 1985 Merlion Cup campaign.

He holds a Physical Education degree.

References

External links 
 Terceirotempo.bol.uol Article

1945 births
2019 deaths
Brazilian footballers
Grêmio Foot-Ball Porto Alegrense players
Clube Atlético Juventus players
Brazilian football managers
Brunei national football team managers
Brazilian expatriate football managers
Expatriate football managers in Brunei
Brazilian expatriate sportspeople in Brunei
Association footballers not categorized by position